Carex riloensis is a species of sedge in the family Cyperaceae, native to the Rhodope Mountains of Bulgaria. Its chromosome number is 2n=26.

References

riloensis
Endemic flora of Bulgaria
Plants described in 1993